Tedd Gassman (born March 6, 1943) is the Iowa State Representative from the 7th District.  A Republican, he has served in the Iowa House of Representatives since 2013.

, Gassman serves on several committees in the Iowa House – the Education, Environmental Protection, Judiciary, and Local Government committees.  He also serves as the vice chair of the Administration and Regulation Appropriations Subcommittee.

Electoral history 
*incumbent

References

External links 

 Representative Tedd Gassman official Iowa General Assembly site
 
 Financial information (state office) at the National Institute for Money in State Politics

Republican Party members of the Iowa House of Representatives
Living people
People from Winnebago County, Iowa
1943 births
21st-century American politicians